Chadian Civil War may refer to:
Chadian Civil War (1965–1979)
Chadian Civil War (1979–1986), amid the Chadian–Libyan conflict
Chadian Civil War (2005–2010)
Insurgency in Northern Chad
2021 Northern Chad offensive

See also
War in Chad (disambiguation)